The 1998 WNBA season was the second for the New York Liberty. The Liberty finished with an 18-12 mark, but they missed the playoffs after losing a tiebreaker to the Charlotte Sting.

Offseason

WNBA Draft

Regular season

Season standings

Season schedule

Player stats

References

External links
Liberty on Basketball Reference

New York Liberty seasons
New York
New York Liberty